Pierre Salvadori (born 8 November 1964) is a French film director from Santo-Pietro-di-Venaco, known for works on romantic comedies such as Hors de prix (2006).

Life and career
In 1989 Salvadori wrote his first screenplay, which would then become the hit film  (Wild Target), which he directed in 1993. The film garnered the young director a César nomination for Best First Work, though he had already tested his directorial capabilities the year before with the short film Ménage.

Cible émouvante was remade in London by Jonathan Lynn as Wild Target (2009)

In 1995, Salvadori began working with Marie Trintignant and Guillaume Depardieu, whom he cast in the highly successful films The Apprentices and Comme elle respire. And in 2000, Salvadori switched gears from comedy to the dark thriller The Sandmen.

Filmography

Director
The Trouble With You (2018)
In the Courtyard (2014)
De vrais mensonges (2010)
Priceless (2006)
After You... (2003)
The Sandmen (2000) Longer version for Cinemas of "Le détour"
Le détour (2000) TV
Comme elle respire (1998)
L'@mour est à réinventer (1996) TV 1 EpisodeLes apprentis (1995) (1993)

ActorTu vas rire, mais je te quitte (2005)White Lies (1998)La femme du cosmonaute (1998)The Banned Woman (1997)L'histoire du garçon qui voulait qu'on l'embrasse '' (1994)

External links

1964 births
Living people
French film directors
French male actors
French male screenwriters
French screenwriters